Kennedy is a coastal locality in the Cassowary Coast Region, Queensland, Australia.

Geography 
Kennedy is on the coast with the Coral Sea forming its eastern boundary. The Bruce Highway passes through the locality from south to north. The North Coast railway line also passes through the locality from south to north, just to the west of the highway. The locality is served by the Kennedy railway station.

The eastern and coastal part of the locality is within the Girramay National Park. Areas in the west of the locality are part of the Cardwell State Forest. The remaining land is predominantly freeland used for farming. The eastern part of the locality and the farmland is mostly at sea level but rises to 500 metres above sea level in the north-west of the locality in the foothills of nearby Mount Carruchan.

History 
The locality was named after the Kennedy railway station, which was originally the Mulgan railway station until it was renamed in 20 February 1926 after the explorer Edmund Kennedy.

Kennedy Creek Provisional School opened on 14 March 1927, becoming Kennedy Creek State School on 1 November 1944. It was renamed Kennedy State School on 19 February 1945.

In the 2006 census, Kennedy had a population of 312 people.

Education 
Kennedy State School is a government primary (Prep-6) school for boys and girls at 161 Kennedy Creek Road. In 2017, the school had an enrolment of 21 students with 4 teachers (3 full-time equivalent) and 7 non-teaching staff (4 full-time equivalent).

References

Cassowary Coast Region
Coastline of Queensland
Localities in Queensland